Mastodon Field is a baseball venue in Fort Wayne, Indiana, United States.  It is home to the Purdue Fort Wayne Mastodons baseball team of the NCAA Division I Horizon League.  The venue has a capacity of 200 spectators.

Prior to the 2011 season, the field's surface and pitcher's mound were renovated.  It also features a brick backstop, dugouts, batting cages, and grandstand seating.

See also 
 List of NCAA Division I baseball venues

References 

College baseball venues in the United States
Baseball venues in Indiana
Purdue Fort Wayne Mastodons baseball